The 2022 DStv Mzansi Viewers' Choice Awards were the 4th annual DStv Magic Viewers Choice Awards. The ceremony was held at Sun Arena, South  on June 25, 2022. The event recognized the biggest achievements in television, radio, music, sports, and comedy in South Africa. The nominations and host were revealed via a virtual livestream on April 14, 2022.

Performances

Presenters

 Presley Chweneyagae and Nomsa Buthelezi — presented Favorite Comedian

 Kwezi Ndlovu and Theo Baloyi - presented Favorite DJ

 Ayanda Thabethe and Bryan Habana  - presented Favorite sports personality

 LaSizwe and Sannah Mchunu - presented Favorite rising star

 Ntando Duma - presented Favorite TV presenter

 Somizi and Vusi Kunene - presented Favorite music artist or group

 Clement Moasa - presented Favorite song

 Boity and Themba - presented Favorite radio personality

 Nyiko Shiburi - presented Enriching Life Award

 Lerato Kganyago and DJ Ph - presented Best Actor

 T-Bo Touch and Mphowabadimo - presented Best Actress

 Khutso Theledi and Siphesihle Ndaba - presented Favorite personality

 Nthati Moshesh and Motshabi Tyelele - presented DStv Legend Award

 Kgomotso Christopher and Lunga Siyo - presented Ultimate Viewers' Choice

Winners and nominees
Below the list are the nominees and winners listed first in bold.

References 

South African television awards
South African music awards
DStv Mzansi Viewers' Choice
DStv Mzansi Viewers' Choice Awards